James Jowers (1939–2009) was an American street photographer. Jowers began receiving training in photography and darkroom techniques while serving in the United States Army. While working the night shift as a porter at St. Luke's Hospital, he would spend his free time during the day roaming the streets of his Lower East Side neighborhood and the rest of Manhattan, capturing a gritty, funny, and idiosyncratic view of the city.

Jowers' photographs were included as illustrations for articles in The New York Times and Forbes in the 1970s. In 2007 and 2008, George Eastman Museum acquired the photographs and negatives he made between 1964 and 1980.

Publications with contributions by Jowers
 Whitten, Whitten and W. Lance Bennett. The Study of Society. Guilford, CT: Dushkin Publishing Group, 1973.
 Wilkins, Ronald J. Man and Woman. Dubuque, Iowa: William C. Brown, 1975.
 Stark, Rodney. Social Problems. New York: Random House, 1975.
 Photography Annual 1975. New York: Ziff Davis, 1974.
 Meyers, Richard and David Giannini, ed. Genesis: Grasp. Vol. 1, No. 1. New York, Genesis: Grasp Press, 1968.
 Lindgren, Henry Clay. An Introduction to Social Psychology. New York: Wiley, 1973.
 Goldenberg, Herbert. Abnormal Psychology: A Social/Community Approach. Monterey, CA: Brooks/Cole Publishing Co, 1977.

Collection
Jowers' work is held in the following permanent public collection:
George Eastman Museum, Rochester, New York

Group exhibitions 
 What We're Collecting Now: The Family Photographed, September 5, 2009 – July 18, 2010, George Eastman Museum, Rochester, New York
 The Gender Show, June 15, 2013 – January 10, 2016, George Eastman Museum, Rochester, New York; then toured. Photographs by Jowers, Robert Frank, Mary Ellen Mark, Julia Margaret Cameron, Edward Steichen, Lejaren à Hiller, Nickolas Muray, Mark Goodman, Vincent Cianni, and Elias Goldensky.

References

External links
Some of Jowers' photographs published by George Eastman House on Flickr

20th-century American photographers
Street photographers
1939 births
2009 deaths